Bianca Rosa Hansberg (born 7 February 1941) is a former Italian female sport shooter who won medals at individual senior level at the World Championships and European Championships.

Biography
Bianca Rosa Hansberg was among the pioneers of sport shooting in Italy. She competed in the sporting skeet discipline in which she went on to win two world titles and two individual European titles. However in 1978 at the world championships in Seoul she managed to win a gold medal with the team in the trap.

Honours
 CONI: Golden Collar of Sports Merit: Collare d'Oro al Merito Sportivo (2019).

See also
Trap World Champions
Skeet World Champions
Trap and skeet European Champions

References

External links
 
 Bianca Rosa Hansberg at AMOVA 

1941 births
Trap and double trap shooters
Italian female sport shooters
Living people
Place of birth missing (living people)